During the Joseon Dynasty royal titles and styles (forms of address) had been extensive and complex. The general title of the king was wang (왕, 王) until Gojong of Korea crowned himself hwangje (황제, 皇帝), or emperor, a title that was only allowed for Chinese emperors. Official titles came with official forms of address, depending on who the addressee was and by whom he or she was addressed.

Royal family

Naming
Rulers in Korea (following Chinese customs) had several names, changing with their titles. Sons were given children's names, and when they were appointed crown prince, they were given an adult name and the crown prince name. When they became king, they were addressed as such, personal names were not used. After the death of a king, he was given several names. One is the temple name (묘호, 廟號; myoho), which he was given when his spirit tablet was placed at Jongmyo Shrine. This is the name by which historians usually refer to Joseon kings. The myoho could end in either jo (조, 祖, "progenitor") or jong (종, 宗, "ancestor"). The preceding syllable was an adjective suitable for the king. The other name was the posthumous name (시호, 諡號, siho). This is a longer name, made up of adjectives characteristic of the king's rule. For example, Gyeongjong of Joseon's posthumous name was King Deokmun Ikmu Sunin Seonhyo the Great (덕문익무순인선효대왕, 德文翼武純仁宣孝大王), while his temple name was Gyeongjong (경종, 景宗).

Titles and styles
Forms of address were combined with names, titles or both, for example:
 Jusang jeonha 주상 전하 (His Majesty the King)
Jungjeon mama 중전 마마 (Her Royal Highness the Queen) 
 Seja jeoha 세자 저하 (His Royal Highness the Crown Prince)
Daegun daegam 대군 대감 (His Excellency the Grand Prince)
 Gongju agassi [in childhood] 공주 아가씨 (Her Young Highness the Princess) then Gongju mama 공주 마마 [in adulthood] (Her Royal Highness the Princess)

Consorts and concubines

Consorts and concubines of the king in the harem (hugung, 후궁/ 後宮) had a certain rank, according to which their titles and forms of address were formulated. Titles came with the form of address of mama (마마 / 媽媽).

Ranks in order after the Queen Consort:

Royal court

Officials

See also 
 Naehun

References

Joseon dynasty
Royal titles